In the first edition of the tournament, Kerry-Anne Guse and Akemi Nishiya won the tournament by defeating Laura Garrone and Mercedes Paz 6–0, 6–3 in the final.

Seeds

Draw

Draw

References

External links
 Official results archive (ITF)
 Official results archive (WTA)

WTA San Marino
WTA San Marino